Danielle Ward (born 9 October 1978) is a British stand-up comedian and writer.

Career

Early career
Ward worked as an economic researcher at London's South Korean Embassy before she became a comedian.

Comedy
In 2006, Ward won the Time Out'''s Critic's Choice award for Best Newcomer and wrote Take A Break Tales - exaggerated adaptations of women's magazine stories - in which she appeared with Neil Edmond, Emma Fryer and Isy Suttie at the Edinburgh Festival Fringe. The next year she co-wrote Psister Psycho, a musical about a killer robotic lesbian nun, with Martin White for the 2007 Edinburgh Festival which was a cult hit and was nominated for the Chortle Award for Best Full Length Show 2008. She was also a regular member of Robin Ince's Book Club where she performed under the guise of Andy McNabb, Heather Mills McCartney, Adam Ant and David Bowie. She has performed five solo stand-up shows at the Edinburgh Fringe.

Ward has written for many comedy radio shows including The News Quiz, The Now Show, The Lee Mack Show, Look Away Now, Anna and Katy and Day the Music Died. She has written for TV shows including Horrible Histories, Harry Hill's TV Burp, Not Going Out and Mongrels.

Radio
Ward co-presented Dave Gorman's Absolute Radio Sunday morning show from when the show started in October 2009 until its end in November 2012. Her frequent collaborator Martin White was also a long term contributor to the show.

Ward created the BBC Radio 4 comedy panel show Dilemma, which ran for four series 2011-15 and was hosted by Sue Perkins. Danielle appeared several times as a guest on the show.

Music
Ward also hosts "Ward and White's Karaoke Circus", a live music karaoke night at the Edinburgh Festival, The 100 Club and its regular home of The Albany.

An experienced bass player she has released three albums with Cardiff indie band The Loves. She plays guitar in Brighton indie band The Super Wolfgang.

Podcasts
Alongside David Reed, Ward co-presents the weekly Absolute Radio film podcast, Film Fandango. The series began in November 2011. From November 2012, Ward has been in Phyllida Lloyd's all-female-cast stage production of Julius Caesar. In her absence from the Film Fandango podcast, her place was taken by comedian Marek Larwood, though she did appear alongside Reed and Larwood in the final episode of 2012 (episode 60).

Ward also hosts the Sony Award-winning comedy panel-show podcast Do the Right Thing in addition to devising and writing the comedy panel show Dilemma on BBC Radio 4. From 2017 Ward presented a podcast series called Any Stupid Questions where basic or perhaps silly questions people might be embarrassed to ask are posed to expert guests.

Script writer

Ward is known for her dark and idiosyncratic writing and was the holder of the BBC Radio writers bursary 2006-2007. Ward featured on Newswipe with Charlie Brooker for BBC Four. For children, Ward has written on Danger Mouse and Minnie The Minx''.

In March 2023 Ward was announced to have gained a place on the BBC Writersroom pilot scheme.

Awards

Personal life

Ward grew up in Nottingham. She is married to David Reed and her first child, a daughter, was born in September 2017.

References

External links

Interview with Danielle Ward, from suchsmallportions.com
Interview with The Humourdour

Living people
British bass guitarists
British women comedians
English podcasters
British women podcasters
Women bass guitarists
21st-century women musicians
21st-century bass guitarists
1978 births